Viharilal College for Home and Social Science is the Department of Home Science, University of Calcutta, Kolkata, India. This is a University Campus that provides both graduate and postgraduate courses in two disciplines of Home Science- Food and Nutrition and Human Development. The Institute also Provides Excellent Placement and Scholarship for its Students. It is affiliated with the University of Calcutta.

See also 
List of colleges affiliated to the University of Calcutta
Education in India
Education in West Bengal

References

External links
College for Home and Social Science

University of Calcutta affiliates
Universities and colleges in Kolkata
Educational institutions established in 1957
1857 establishments in British India